This is a list of Kosovar Supercup finals from 1992 to 2019.

Fixtures and results

1992–1999

2000–2009

2010–2019

Notes and references

Notes

References

External links
 
Kosovar Supercup at RSSSF

Supercup finals (1992–2019)
Finals